Philesia is a South American genus of flowering plants in the family Philesiaceae first described as a genus in 1789. The flower is mostly pink in color, but some darker, more purple variations have been recorded.

There is only one known species, Philesia magellanica, a shrub native to southern Chile and southern Argentina.

References

External links
 
 

Monotypic Liliales genera
Liliales
Flora of South America